"Hej, sa Petronella" is a song with lyrics by  Lennart Hellsing and music by Knut Brodin, and published in 1957 in  Våra visor I. The song deals with fictional person Petronella from Plaskeby (from the Swedish verb plaska, "to splash", and the noun by, "village"), and the theme is trying to be happy in all conditions and weather. Creating a boat out of items is a common theme in many fairy tales. The melody is based on a folk tune.

Recordings
An early recording was done by Parkskolan in Västerhaninge on the 1971 album Lek med toner 2.

Publication
Barnens svenska sångbok, 1999, under the lines "Sånger för småfolk".

References

1957 songs
Swedish children's songs
Swedish-language songs
Songs about fictional female characters
Songs with lyrics by Lennart Hellsing